Bakhscheevo (Бакшеево) is a village in Russia near town of Roshal in Shatura district of Moscow Oblast. The population was 2002 people in 2010.

Backsheevo was founded as a village of peat diggers for the Shatura Power Station.

References 

Rural localities in Moscow Oblast